Helmut Hasse (25 August 1898 – 26 December 1979) was a German mathematician working in algebraic number theory, known for fundamental contributions to class field theory, the application of p-adic numbers to local class field theory and diophantine geometry (Hasse principle), and to local zeta functions.

Life

Hasse was born in Kassel, Province of Hesse-Nassau, the son of Judge Paul Reinhard Hasse, also written Haße (12 April 1868 – 1 June 1940, son of Friedrich Ernst Hasse and his wife Anna Von Reinhard) and his wife Margarethe Louise Adolphine Quentin (born 5 July 1872 in Milwaukee, daughter of retail toy merchant Adolph Quentin (b. May 1832, probably Berlin, Kingdom of Prussia) and Margarethe Wehr (b. about 1840, Prussia), then raised in Kassel).

After serving in the Imperial German Navy in World War I, he studied at the University of Göttingen, and then at the University of Marburg under Kurt Hensel, writing a dissertation in 1921 containing the Hasse–Minkowski theorem, as it is now called, on quadratic forms over number fields. He then held positions at Kiel, Halle and Marburg. He was Hermann Weyl's replacement at Göttingen in 1934.

Hasse was an Invited Speaker of the International Congress of Mathematicians (ICM) in 1932 in Zürich and a Plenary Speaker of the ICM in 1936 in Oslo.

In 1933 Hasse had signed the Vow of allegiance of the Professors of the German Universities and High-Schools to Adolf Hitler and the National Socialistic State.

Politically, he applied for membership in the Nazi Party in 1937, but this was denied to him allegedly due to his remote Jewish ancestry. After the war, he briefly returned to Göttingen in 1945, but was excluded by the British authorities. After brief appointments in Berlin, from 1948 on he settled permanently as professor at University of Hamburg.

Publications
 (3 vols.)
 Number theory, Springer, 1980, 2002 (Eng. trans. of Zahlentheorie, 3rd edn., Akademie Verlag 1969)
 Vorlesungen über Zahlentheorie, Springer, 1950
 Über die Klassenzahl abelscher Zahlkörper, Akademie Verlag, Berlin, 1952.
 Höhere Algebra vols. 1, 2, Sammlung Göschen, 1967, 1969
 Vorlesungen über Klassenkörpertheorie, physica Verlag, Würzburg 1967

 Bericht über neuere Untersuchungen und Probleme aus der Theorie der algebraischen Zahlkörper, 1965 (reprint from Berichts aus dem Jahresbericht der DMV 1926/27)
 New edn. of  Algebraische Theorie der Körper  by Ernst Steinitz, together with Reinhold Baer, with a new appendix on Galois theory. Walter de Gruyter 1930.
Hasse Mathematik als Wissenschaft, Kunst und Macht, DMV Mitteilungen 1997, Nr.4 (Published version of a lecture given at the University of Hamburg 1959)
Hasse „Geschichte der Klassenkörpertheorie“, Jahresbericht DMV 1966
Hasse „Die moderne algebraische Methode“, Jahresbericht DMV 1930
Brauer, Hasse, Noether „Beweis eines Hauptsatzes in der Theorie der Algebren“, Journal reine angew.Math. 1932
Hasse „Theorie der abstrakten elliptischen Funktionenkörper 3- Riemann Vermutung“, Journal reine angew. Math., 1936
Hasse „Über die Darstellbarkeit von Zahlen durch quadratische Formen im Körper der rationalen Zahlen“, Journal reine angew.Math. 1923

See also
Hasse diagram
Hasse invariant of an algebra
Hasse invariant of an elliptic curve
Hasse invariant of a quadratic form
Artin–Hasse exponential
Hasse–Weil L-function
Hasse norm theorem
Hasse's algorithm
Hasse's theorem on elliptic curves
Hasse–Witt matrix
Albert–Brauer–Hasse–Noether theorem
Dedekind–Hasse norm
Collatz conjecture
Local class field theory

References

External links

Another biography

1898 births
1979 deaths
Scientists from Kassel
People from Hesse-Nassau
Number theorists
20th-century German mathematicians
Academic staff of the University of Marburg
Academic staff of the University of Kiel
Academic staff of the Martin Luther University of Halle-Wittenberg
Academic staff of the University of Hamburg
Academic staff of the University of Göttingen
University of Göttingen alumni
University of Marburg alumni
German people of Jewish descent
Imperial German Navy personnel of World War I
Members of the German Academy of Sciences at Berlin